The Tumansky RD-9 (initially designated Mikulin AM-5) was an early Soviet turbojet engine, not based on pre-existing German or British designs. The AM-5, developed by scaling down the AM-3, was available in 1952 and completed testing in 1953; it produced   thrust without afterburner. AM-5 engine is notable for making possible the first mass-produced supersonic interceptor, the MiG-19, and the first Soviet all-weather area interceptor, the Yak-25. When Sergei Tumansky replaced Alexander Mikulin as the OKB-24's chief designer in 1956, the engine was renamed RD-9. The engine was later built under license in China as the WP-6.

Variants and applications

RD-9A
RD-9B Used in the East German civilian jetliner project Baade 152 in 1958 and 1959, replaced when Pirna 014 engines became available.
RD-9AK Non-afterburning versions for the Yak-25 and Yak-26.
RD-9AF-300 Afterburning version for the Yak-27 and Yak-28.
RD-9AF2-300 Afterburning version for the Yak-27 and Yak-28.
RD-9B Afterburning version for the early variants of MiG-19.
RD-9BK Version for Lavochkin La-17M.
RD-9BF-811 Afterburning version for the later variants of MiG-19.
RD-9V Afterburning version used in the Ilyushin Il-40P. 
WP-6 Chinese built version for the Shenyang J-6.
WP-6A a Chinese upgraded version for the Nanchang Q-5 and J-6C.
WP-6Z further developed for the cancelled Nanchang J-12
NK-TJ North Korean version built for MiG-19 and Shenyang J-6

Specifications (RD-9BF-811)

See also

Notes

References

 The Osprey Encyclopedia of Russian Aircraft: 1875-1995, Bill Gunston, .

External links

 RD-9B page on LeteckeMotory.cz (cs)

Tumansky aircraft engines
1950s turbojet engines